Walter Robinson  (aka Mike Robinson, born 1950, Wilmington, Delaware) is a New York City-based painter, publisher, art curator and art writer. He has been called a Neo-pop painter, as well as a member of the 1980s The Pictures Generation.

Life and education
Robinson was born in Wilmington, Delaware, and raised in Tulsa. He moved to New York City to attend Columbia University in 1968.  Subsequently, he graduated from the Whitney Independent Study Program in 1973. He lived in SoHo in the 1970s and on Ludlow Street on the Lower East Side in the 1980s and '90s, and currently lives uptown with a studio in Long Island City in Queens.

Painting career
Robinson is a postmodern painter whose work features painterly images taken from covers of romance novel paperbacks as well as still lifes of cheeseburgers, French fries and beer, and pharmaceutical products like aspirin and nasal spray. He also made and exhibited large-scale spin paintings in the mid-1980s, in advance of his colleague Damien Hirst.

A 2014 touring exhibition of Robinson's paintings included more than 90 works dating from 1979 to 2014. It premiered at the University Galleries at Illinois State University in Normal, Illinois, and subsequently appeared in Philadelphia at the Moore College of Art. The show's final stop was at the Jeffrey Deitch Gallery in New York City in September 2016.

Robinson's works have been exhibited at several New York galleries since the 1980s, including Semaphore Gallery and Metro Pictures Gallery. An exhibition of his paintings, paired with a poem by Charles Bukowski, There's a  Bluebird in My Heart, was on view in Spring 2016 at Owen James Gallery in Greenpoint, Brooklyn.

Art criticism and other activities
Robinson began writing about art in the 1970s, when he co-founded with Edit DeAk the art zine Art-Rite in New York's SoHo art district. 

He subsequently served as news editor of Art in America magazine (1980–96) and founding editor of Artnet Magazine (1996-2012). In 2013-14 he was a columnist for Artspace.com, where his essay on Zombie Formalism appeared. He also served as art editor of the East Village Eye in the early ‘80s.

Robinson was also active in Collaborative Projects (aka Colab) in the early 1980s, acting as president for a short time and participating in The Times Square Show. 

In the ‘90s he was a correspondent for GalleryBeat TV, a public-access television show.

Footnotes

References
 Hager, Steve. Art After Midnight: The East Village Scene. St. Matins Press, 1986.
 Carlo McCormick, The Downtown Book: The New York Art Scene, 1974–1984, Princeton University Press, 2006.
 Alan W. Moore and Marc Miller, eds. ABC No Rio Dinero: The Story of a Lower East Side Art Gallery New York: ABC No Rio with Collaborative Projects, 1985.
 Art Net: The Life and Times of Walter Robinson: A story of outré journals, East Village parties, reality television, painting By Andrew Russeth
 Carlo McCormick & Walter Robinson, "Slouching Toward Avenue D", Art in America, 1982.

External links
 Walter Robinson in conversation at The Conversation website.
 Walter Robinson interviewed by Phong Bui at the Brooklyn Rail

American art critics
20th-century American painters
20th-century American male artists
American male painters
21st-century American painters
21st-century American male artists
Living people
Postmodern artists
Artists from New York (state)
1950 births